Maria Teresa Agnesi Pinottini (October 17, 1720 – January 19, 1795) was an Italian composer. Though she was most famous for her compositions, she was also an accomplished harpsichordist and singer, and the majority of her surviving compositions were written for keyboard, the voice, or both.

Life
Maria Teresa was born in Milan to Pietro Agnesi, an overbearing man in the lesser nobility. He provided early education for both Maria Teresa and her more famous older sister, Maria Gaetana, a mathematics and language prodigy who lectured and debated all over Europe while her sister performed. Maria Teresa was married to Pier Antonio Pinottini on June 13, 1752, and they settled in a district populated by intellects and artists, but eventually suffered severe financial ruin. Pinottini died not too long afterwards.

Maria Teresa died in Milan in 1795.

Career
Not much is known about Maria Teresa. Nothing is known of her education or teachers, and the dates of her compositions are largely unknown. Many of her compositions have been lost, although there are records of their existence. Her career was made possible by the Austrian Lombardy, which proved progressive and enlightened in women's rights. The movement was more prevalent in Vienna and Dresden rather than her hometown of Milan, and Maria Teresa found more success and more appreciative audiences in these cities than in her birthplace.

Maria Teresa had several famous performances, perhaps the most famous on July 16, 1739, when famous French traveler Charles de Brosses was very impressed by her music. He was not the only one; the Count Gerolamo Riccati wrote several letters praising her compositions and musical talent. Another very famous performance was her theatrical debut, the Cantata Pastorale Il Ristoro d'Arcadia, in Milan at the Teatro Regio Ducale in 1747 where she dedicated her piece to various rulers of the surrounding areas of Saxony and Austria.

Agnesi would enjoy the patronage of Maria Theresa, holy Roman Empress and sovereign of Lombardy, and Maria Antonia Walpurgis, a gifted composer and contemporary. The Roman Empress was said to have sung at Maria Teresa Agnesi's famous 1747 performance.

Legacy and influence
Today her music is seldom performed. Her keyboard music, while often technically challenging, is said to have been somewhat hackneyed and not distinctive. Her work does seem to have matured throughout her career; her early works are simple and clean, while her later works are more virtuosic, complex, and melodramatic.

Compositions
Operas
 II Restauro di Arcadia (cant. pastorale, G. Riviera), Milan, Teatro Regio Ducale, 1747 (lost)
 La Sofonisba (dramma eroico, 3, G.F. Zanetti)
 Ciro in Armenia (dramma serio, 3, ? Agnesi), Milan, Teatro Regio Ducale, 26 Dec 1753, Act 3 frags
 Il re pastore (dramma serio, 3, P. Metastasio), 1755?
 La Insubria Consolata (Componimento drammatico, 2), Milan, 1766-Nitocri (dramma serio, 3, A. Zeno), Act 2 frags
 Ulisse in Campania (serenata, 2)
Keyboard, small ensemble, vocal music
 12 arias, S, 2
 Aria en Murki: Still, stille Mann!
 4 concertos (F, F, F, D) (str pts missing in A-Wn, D-Dl), 1 cited in 1766 Breitkopf catalogue
 Sonata, G, cited in 1767 Breitkopf catalogue (1998)
 Sonata, F (1992)
 Allegro ou Presto
 Allemande militare & Menuetto grazioso, kbd (with special stops), ed. F. Brodszky, -Thesaurus Musicus, xvii (1962)
 Lost: conc., Eâ, hpd, cited in 1766 Breitkopf catalogue; sonata, G, kbd, cited in 1767—Breitkopf catalogue; Airs divers

Discography
 Hofkomponistinnen in Europa: Aus Boudoir und Gärten, Vol. 2
 Sonata for Harpsichord in G Major
 CD “Note Femminill”-Concerto

References
 Sven Hansell, Robert L. Kendrick. "Maria Teresa Agnesi", Grove Music Online, ed. L. Macy (accessed February 11, 2006), oxfordmusiconline.com (subscription access only)
 Glickman, Sylvia and Martha Furman, ed. Women Composers: Music Through the Ages. NY: GK Hall and Co., 1998
 Hansell, Sven, “Agnesi-Pinottini, Maria Teresa”, Grove Music Online. http://www.grovemusic.com/shared/views/article.html?section=opera.9000555 (subscription access only)
 Hansell, Sven and Kendrick, Robert L., “Agnesi, Maria Teresa”, Grove Music Online. http://www.grovemusic.com/shared/views/article.html?section=music.0029 (subscription access only)
 Tick, Judith, “Women in Music: Western Classical Traditions in Europe and the USA”, Grove Music Online.http://www.grovemusic.com/shared/views/article.html?section=music52554.2.3 (subscription access only)
 Carrer, Pinuccia and Petrucci, Barbara, “Donna Teresa Agnesi compositrice illustre (1720-1795)” (in Italian), edizioni San Marco dei Giustiniani, Genova 2010

External links

 

1720 births
1795 deaths
18th-century Italian singers
18th-century Italian women
Italian Classical-period composers
Italian women classical composers
Musicians from Milan
18th-century Italian composers
18th-century women composers
Italian salon-holders